Howard Arthur Bruce Gardiner (3 January 1944 – 10 June 2018) was a Zimbabwean first-class cricketer and international match referee.

He played as a wicketkeeper and useful lower-order batsman for Rhodesia from 1965 to 1976. After retiring he became a match referee, beginning in an ODI between Pakistan and Sri Lanka at Singapore in 1996. He went on to referee four more ODI games as well as a Test match at Centurion in 1998.

He was managing director of BOC Zimbabwe Ltd.

References

External links

1944 births
2018 deaths
Cricketers from Bulawayo
Zimbabwean cricketers
Rhodesia cricketers
Cricket match referees
Wicket-keepers
White Rhodesian people